Susan Külm (born 13 August 1996 in Tailinn) is an Estonian biathlete. She competed at the 2022 Winter Olympics, in Women's pursuit, Women's relay, Women's individual, and Women's sprint. She competed at the 2021–22 Biathlon World Cup.

Biathlon results
All results are sourced from the International Biathlon Union.

Olympic Games

World Championships

References 

Living people
1988 births
Estonian female biathletes
Sportspeople from Tallinn
Olympic biathletes of Estonia
Biathletes at the 2022 Winter Olympics